Moresada is a Papuan language of Madang Province, Papua New Guinea.

References

Pomoikan languages
Languages of Madang Province